Pak Song Nam (April 11, 1943 or 1945 – 1980 or April 1982) was a Korean professional wrestler who appeared primarily under the name Pak Song. He is notable for his appearances with the National Wrestling Alliance (NWA) and the Championship Wrestling from Florida (CWF) during the 1970s. His feud with Dusty Rhodes in 1974 is credited for making the young wrestler one of the most popular "fan favorites" in the NWA's Florida territory.

Career 
Song began wrestling in 1966 in Japan after being trained by Kintaro Oki, known as Kim Ill, who later became tag team partners for Japan Wrestling Association. He made his debut to North America in 1970 where he worked in Texas. That same year, Song defeated Terry Funk for the NWA Western States Heavyweight Championship and teamed with Oki to capture the NWA Texas Tag Team Championship from Gorgeous George, Jr. and Rufus R. Jones. Song also fought in St. Louis. On September 16, 1972, Song lost to Harley Race in a tournament final for the NWA Missouri Heavyweight Championship.

In 1972, Song would make his debut for Championship Wrestling from Florida. He was portrayed as a martial artist, dubbed "The Korean Assassin", and broke wood and cement with his bare hands on television. Managed by Gary Hart, Song feuded with Dusty Rhodes, Hiro Matsuda, Jack Brisco and Terry Funk. Song's feud with Dusty Rhdoes also worked in Georgia. Song would stay in Florida until 1979. He even was their heavyweight champion.

During his time in Florida, Song worked in various territories in the States and a return to Japan in 1975 for All Japan Pro Wrestling. 

On October 10, 1976, Song fought NWF World Heavyweight Champion Antonio Inoki in Seoul, South Korea where Song lost by count out in 18 minutes. 

After his time in Florida, Song returned Texas and St. Louis. In 1980, Song made his debut for Central States Wrestling where he teamed with Great Kabuki to win the NWA Central States Tag Team Championship defeating Bob Brown and Dick Murdoch. They dropped the titles to Bob Brown and Pat O'Connor. He would finish his career in the Texas-based Big Time Wrestling promotion. His last documented match was an eight-man elimination match with Stan Stasiak, Gino Hernandez and Gary Young against Bruiser Brody and The Von Erich Family (Fritz, Kevin and David Von Erich) at the Dallas Sportatorium on October 26, 1980.

Personal life
Song died from Marfan syndrome.

Championships and accomplishments
Big Time Wrestling
NWA Texas Tag Team Championship (2 times) – with Kim Il and Gino Hernandez

Central States Wrestling
NWA Central States Tag Team Championship (1 time) – with Takachiho

Championship Wrestling from Florida
NWA Florida Heavyweight Championship (2 times)
NWA Southern Heavyweight Championship (Florida version) (2 times)
NWA Florida Tag Team Championship (1 time) – with Eric the Red
NWA United States Tag Team Championship (Florida version) (2 times) – with Jos LeDuc and Killer Khan
NWA United States Tag Team Championship Tournament (1979) - with Killer Khan

Georgia Championship Wrestling
NWA Georgia Tag Team Championship (1 time) – with The Executioner

NWA Hollywood Wrestling
NWA Americas Heavyweight Championship (1 time)
NWA Americas Tag Team Championship (1 time) – with Mr. Wrestling

NWA New Mexico
NWA Rocky Mountain Heavyweight Championship (1 time)

NWA Western States Sports
NWA Western States Heavyweight Championship (2 times)
NWA Brass Knuckles Championship (Amarillo version) (1 time)
NWA Western States Tag Team Championship (2 times) – with Kim Il

Notes

See also
 List of premature professional wrestling deaths

References

External links

1940s births
1980s deaths
South Korean male professional wrestlers
Sport wrestlers from Seoul
People with Marfan syndrome
20th-century professional wrestlers
NWA Florida Heavyweight Champions
NWA Southern Heavyweight Champions (Florida version)
NWA Americas Heavyweight Champions
NWA Georgia Tag Team Champions